Marc Lavoie (born 1954) is a Canadian professor in economics at the University of Ottawa and a former Olympic fencing athlete.

Academic career
Born in Ottawa, Ontario, Canada, Marc Lavoie is a professor in the Department of Economics at the University of Ottawa, where he started teaching in 1979. He got his doctorate from the University of Paris-1.  Besides having published nearly two hundred articles in refereed journals, he has written a number of books, among which are Post-Keynesian Economics: New Foundations (2014), Introduction to Post-Keynesian Economics (2006), translated into four languages, Foundations of Post-Keynesian Economic Analysis (1992), as well as Monetary Economics: An Integrated Approach to Money, Income, Production and Wealth (2007) with Wynne Godley. The latter deals with and employs in its analysis the stock/flow consistent method.

With Mario Seccareccia, he has been the co-editor of three books, including one on the works of Milton Friedman, in addition to writing the first Canadian edition of the Baumol and Blinder first-year textbook (2009).

Lavoie has been the associate editor of the Encyclopedia of Political Economy (1999), and he has been a visiting professor at the universities of Bordeaux, Nice, Rennes, Dijon, Grenoble, Limoges, Lille, Paris-1 and Paris-Nord, as well as Curtin University in Perth, Australia.

Lavoie is also an IMK Research Fellow at the Hans Böckler Foundation in Düsselforf and Policy Fellow at the Broadbent Institute in Toronto. He has lectured at post-Keynesian summer schools in Kansas City, the Levy Economics Institute and Berlin.

Research interests
 Heterodox economic theories
 Post-Keynesian theory
 Growth
 Macroeconomic theory
 Monetary theory and policy
 Economics of sports (discrimination, ice hockey)

Athletic career
Lavoie won the Canadian national senior championship in sabre seven times, in 1975–1979 and 1985–1986. He also won the Canadian national junior championship twice, in 1973–1974, and was second at the under-15 French championships in 1969. He was on the Canadian national team from 1973 to 1984. He participated in the 1975, 1979 and 1983 Pan-American Games finishing fourth in the individual event in sabre in 1979. He also participated in the Commonwealth championships in 1974 (4th), 1978 (2nd) and 1982, and competed at the 1976 and 1984 Summer Olympics. Having been named Carleton University's Male Athlete of the Year in 1973-74 and again in 1974–75, on October 16, 2014, Lavoie was inducted into Carleton University's Athletic Hall of Fame He had previously been inducted into the Hall of Fame of the Fédération d’escrime du Québec.

Los Angeles (1984) 
 7th – Team Men's Sabre

Montreal (1976) 
 30th – Individual Men's Sabre
 9th – Team Men's Sabre

Books
 M. Lavoie, Virginie Monvoisin and Jean-François Ponsot, L'économie post-keynésienne, Devoucerte-La, 2021, 127 pp. 
 M. Lavoie, Post-Keynesian Monetary Theory: Selected Essays, Edward Elgar, 2020, 416 pp. 
M. Lavoie, Post-Keynesian Economics: New Foundations, Cheltenham, Edward Elgar, 2014, 660 pp. 
 Wynne Godley and Marc Lavoie, 2007. Monetary Economics: An Integrated Approach to Credit, Money, Income, Production and Wealth, Palgrave MacMillan.   Description.
 W.J. Baumol, A.S. Blinder, M. Lavoie and M. Seccareccia, Macroeconomics: Principles and Policy, Toronto, Nelson Education, 2009, 440 pp. 
 W.J. Baumol, A.S. Blinder, M. Lavoie and M. Seccareccia, Microeconomics: Principles and Policy, Toronto, Nelson Education, 2009, 495 pp. 
 M. Lavoie, Introduction to Post-Keynesian Economics, Palgrave/Macmillan, 2006, 150 pp. 
 M. Lavoie, La économia postkeynesiana, Barcelona, Icaria editorial, 2005, 142 pp.  (in Spanish)
 M. Lavoie, L’Économie postkeynésienne, Paris, La Découverte (Repères), 2004, 128 pp.  (in French)
 M. Lavoie, Avantage numérique, Gatineau, Vents d'Ouest, 1997, 288 pp.  (in French)
 M. Lavoie, Désavantage numérique, Gatineau, Vents d'Ouest, 1998, 168 pp.  (in French)
 M. Lavoie, Macroéconomie: théorie et controverses postkeynésiennes, Dunod, Paris, 1987, 225 pp.   (in French)
 F. S. Lee and M. Lavoie (eds), In Defense of Post-Keynesian Economics and Heterodox Economics: Response to their Critics, Routledge, London, 2013, 260 pp.  
 M. Lavoie and E. Stockhammer (eds), Wage-Led Growth: An Equitable Strategy for Economic Recovery, International Labour Office - Palgrave Macmillan, Basingstoke, 2013, 193 pp. 
 M. Lavoie and G. Zezza (eds), The Stock-Flow Consistent Approach: Selected Writings of Wynne Godley, Palgrave Macmillan, Basingstoke, 2012, 276 pp.  
 L.P. Rochon, M. Lavoie and M. Seccareccia (eds), Money and Macroeconomic Issues: Alfred Eichner and Post-Keynesian Economics, M.E. Sharpe, Armonk (NJ), 2010, 250 pp.  
 M. Lavoie and M. Seccareccia, Central Banking in the Modern World: Alternative Perspectives, Edward Elgar, Cheltenham, 2004, 296 pp. 
 M. Lavoie et M. Seccareccia (dir.), Milton Friedman et son oeuvre, Presses de l'Université de Montréal, Montréal, 1993, 230 pp.   (in French)

See also
 Luigi Pasinetti
 Hyman Minsky
 Wynne Godley

References

External links
 List of selected publications

1954 births
Living people
Canadian economists
Canadian male fencers
Fencers at the 1976 Summer Olympics
Fencers at the 1984 Summer Olympics
Olympic fencers of Canada
Sportspeople from Ottawa
Academic staff of the University of Ottawa
Pan American Games medalists in fencing
Medalists at the 1983 Pan American Games
Pan American Games bronze medalists for Canada
Fencers at the 1983 Pan American Games